Cornwall Hill College is a private, boarding English medium co-educational preparatory and college situated of the suburb in Irene in Centurion in the  Gauteng province of South Africa.

Controversies 
In June 2021, the school was accused of racism and discrimination in the form of comments made by staff members and negative attitudes shown towards students of colour. Parents and students accused the school of rejecting transformation calls after failing to follow through on promises of racial transformation at the school.

School song 
Where blue skies meet the horizon

Where songbirds sing their delight

Where nature's beauty surrounds us

Cradled in the heart of creation

Built on foundations of faith

You will find a school

O Cornwall Hill College  

We will always strive to

Uphold your name with honour, dignity and pride

And as we work and play, as we grow each day

Singuli Omnes, God of grace

Inspire one and all

May every step be courageous

May every word speak of truth

May all our actions reveal love

May our eyes be filled with your beauty

May your spirit of peace prevail in your school

O Cornwall Hill College

We will always strive to

Uphold your name with honour, dignity and pride

And as we work and play, as we grow each day

Singuli Omnes, God of grace

Inspire one and all.

Notable alumni 

Cornwall Hill College matriculants include:

 Brandon Stone (Class of 2011) South African professional golfer. 
 Aiden Markram (Class of 2012) South African professional cricketer. 
 Andrie Steyn (Class of 2014) South African professional cricketer.
 Onthatile Zulu (Class of 2018) South African professional netball player 
 Pieter Coetze (Class of 2022) South African professional swimmer

References

External links 
Cornwall official site

Nondenominational Christian schools in South Africa
Private schools in Gauteng
Educational institutions established in 1998
1998 establishments in South Africa
City of Tshwane Metropolitan Municipality